The Bonerate people are an ethnic group in South Sulawesi, Indonesia. They inhabit around the Selayar island group such as Bonerate, Madu, Kalaotoa, and Karompa islands.

Culture 
The Bonerate people are generally Muslims. Sexually provocative behaviour occurs in possession-trance ritual practiced by women only and were carried out in a way by which they smother glowing embers with their bare feet at the climax of the ritual. The Bonerate language is closely related to the language of the Tukang Besi islands off the southeast coast of Buton island.

References

Ethnic groups in Indonesia
Sulawesi